Seated Woman on a Bench is a bronze sculpture by Willem de Kooning. Modeled in 1972, it was cast in 1976. It is at the Hirshhorn Museum and Sculpture Garden, in Washington, D.C..

See also
 List of public art in Washington, D.C., Ward 2

References

External links
Sotheby's
Waymarking

1972 sculptures
Sculptures by Willem de Kooning
Hirshhorn Museum and Sculpture Garden
Sculptures of the Smithsonian Institution
Bronze sculptures in Washington, D.C.
Outdoor sculptures in Washington, D.C.
Sculptures of women in Washington, D.C.